2015–16 Albanian Cup was the sixty-four season of Albania's annual cup competition. KF Laçi are the most recent winners of the competition, that being their second Cup trophy.

Ties are played in a two-legged format similar to those of European competitions. If the aggregate score is tied after both games, the team with the higher number of away goals advances. If the number of away goals is equal in both games, the match is decided by extra time and a penalty shoot-out, if necessary.

Preliminary round
In order to reduce the number of participating teams for the first round to 32, a preliminary tournament is played. In contrast to the main tournament, the preliminary tournament is held as a single-leg knock-out competition. Matches were played on 27 August 2015 and involved the teams from Kategoria e Dytë.

|-

|}

First round
All 28 teams of the 2015–16 Superiore and Kategoria e Parë entered in this round along with the two qualifiers from the preliminary round. The first legs were played on 16 September 2015 and the second legs took place on 30 September 2015. Skënderbeu played their matches on 6 and 9 September due to commitments in UEFA Europa League.

|}

Skënderbeu advanced to the second round.

Partizani advanced to the second round.

Tirana advanced to the second round.

Laçi advanced to the second round.

Vllaznia advanced to the second round.

Apolonia advanced to the second round.

Bylis advanced to the second round.

Lushnja advanced to the second round.

Sopoti advanced to the second round.

Kukësi advanced to the second round.

Flamurtari advanced to the second round.

Teuta advanced to the second round.

Kamza advanced to the second round.

Tërbuni advanced to the second round.

Kastrioti advanced to the second round.

Iliria advanced to the second round.

Second round
All 16 qualified teams from first round progressed to the second round. The first legs were played on 21 October 2015 and the second legs took place on 4 November 2015. Skënderbeu played their first match on 12 October and the second on 11 November due to commitments in UEFA Europa League.

|}

Skënderbeu advances to the quarter finals.

Partizani advances to the quarter finals.

Laçi advances to the quarter finals.

Kukësi advances to the quarter finals.

Tirana advances to the quarter finals.

Flamurtari advances to the quarter finals.

Teuta advances to the quarter finals.

Vllaznia advances to the quarter finals.

Quarter-finals

|}

Skënderbeu advanced to the semi finals.

Laçi advanced to the semi finals.

Flamurtari advanced to the semi finals.

Kukësi advanced to the semi finals.

Semi-finals
The semi-finals were drawn on 23 March 2016. The first legs were played on 6 April and the second legs were played on 20 April 2016.

 
 
|}

Laçi advanced to the final.

Kukësi advanced to the final.

Final

Notes

References

External links
 Official website 
 Albanian Cup at soccerway.com

Cup
Albanian Cup seasons
Albanian Cup